Copelatus luteomaculatus is a species of diving beetle. It is part of the genus Copelatus in the subfamily Copelatinae of the family Dytiscidae. It was described by Félix Guignot in 1956.

References

luteomaculatus
Beetles described in 1956